Chitnis, Chitnavis or Chitnavese was a title conferred on one who held the office of Secretary of State or "political secretary" in the Maratha Empire. The post was considered to be of equal status to the post of the council of eight ministers or Ashta Pradhan although it was not part of that group. The office of the Chitnis was responsible for all political and diplomatic correspondence but like other officers of the state they were also obligated to perform Military service.
Deshpande writes : 

This surname may be found among Deshastha Rigvedi Brahmin (DRB) and Chandraseniya Kayastha Prabhu (CKP) communities.

Notable people
Notable people with the surname include:

Atul Chitnis (1962–2013), German-born Indian technologist
Chetan Eknath Chitnis (born 1961), Indian biologist
Eknath Vasant Chitnis, Indian space scientist
Leela Chitnis (1909–2003), Indian actress
Pratap Chitnis, Baron Chitnis (1936–2013), British politician
Siddharth Chitnis (born 1987), Indian cricketer
Archana Chitnis, BJP Politician
Khando Ballal Chitnis High-Ranking Diplomat and Chitnis in the Maratha Empire

References

Surnames of Indian origin